Maung Hsu Shin, also spelt Maung Su Shin, born Myo Thant, was a prominent Burmese writer, best known for his science works. He attended Myoma High School in Yangon.

References

People from Ayeyarwady Region
Burmese writers
1932 births
2009 deaths
University of Yangon alumni